is a local history museum located in Omi, Nagano. The museum was opened by the village of Omi on July 20, 1965, to contain displays of local natural history (birds, fish, insects, mineral samples and plants) and human history (Buddhist statues, historical documents and records pertaining to Omi Village). It was expanded on November 19, 1971, with the addition of an aviation pavilion and a number of outdoor static exhibits of former Japan Self-Defense Forces aircraft. The museum facilities were renovated in April 2012.

Aircraft on display
 North American F-86D Sabre 94-8146
 North American F-86F-40 Sabre 82-7865
 Beechcraft T-34A Mentor 51-0337
 Lockheed F-104J Starfighter 46-8608
 Curtiss C-46D Commando 91-1144 (nose section and some other parts only)
 Sikorsky H-19C Chickasaw 11-4716

References

Aerospace museums in Japan
Military and war museums in Japan
Museums in Nagano Prefecture
Museums established in 1965
1965 establishments in Japan
Omi, Nagano